Francis William Fonseca (born 11 March 1967) is a Belizean politician who served as leader of the People's United Party (PUP) and as Leader of the Opposition of Belize from 2011 to 2016. First elected to the Belize House of Representatives from the Belize City-based Freetown constituency in 2003, Fonseca served as Attorney General and Minister of Education, Culture and Labour in Prime Minister Said Musa's cabinet until February 2008, when the PUP lost the general election to the opposition United Democratic Party (UDP). Fonseca was one of only six PUP representatives nationwide to retain his seat in the National Assembly in the 2008 election.

Following the election defeat and subsequent resignation of Musa from the PUP leadership in March 2008, the party held a convention to select its new leader. Fonseca was a candidate for the party leadership at this convention, and he was considered to be the candidate preferred by the party establishment, but he was defeated by Johnny Briceño, receiving 310 votes against 330 for Briceño. Fonseca successfully contested the PUP leadership in 2011 after Briceño's resignation. He led the party in the 2012 election, in which it was narrowly defeated.

A National Convention was called on for January 31, 2016. Three candidates ran for the position, Orange Walk Central representative, Hon. Johnny Briceño, recently elected Lake Independence representative, Cordel Hyde and Freetown incumbent, Francis Fonseca contested it again although his announcement of retirement from politics.
Following the November 2020 General Election in Belize in which the People's United Party was successful,  Francis Fonseca was appointed as Minister of Education,  Culture   Science and Technology in the Cabinet of Prime Minister John Briceno.

Personal

Fonseca is an alumnus of St. John's College in Belize City and the University of Southwestern Louisiana, where he received a bachelor's degree in economics. In 1994 Fonseca received a law degree from the University of the West Indies. He is a cousin of former PUP Rep. Ralph Fonseca, who also served in the Musa Cabinet.

References

1967 births
Living people
People from Belize City
People's United Party politicians
Belizean people of Spanish descent
Government ministers of Belize
Attorneys-General of Belize
Members of the Belize House of Representatives for Freetown